Foulds is a surname. People with the surname include:

Adam Foulds, British novelist and poet
Bert Foulds, English footballer
Fred Foulds, English cricketer
Garry Foulds, Australian rules footballer
Geoff Foulds, English snooker player
Gerry Scott Foulds, English production designer
Jim Foulds, Canadian politician
John Foulds, English classical music composer
June Foulds, British sprinter
Matthew Foulds, English footballer
Neal Foulds, English snooker player
William C. Foulds, Canadian football Hall of Famer

See also
 Robinson–Foulds metric

Surnames of Old English origin